Condica illecta is a moth of the family Noctuidae. It is found in both the Indo-Australian and Pacific tropics, including Borneo, Hawaii, Hong Kong, India,  New Guinea, the Society Islands, Taiwan and Queensland and New South Wales in Australia. It is also present in New Zealand.

The wingspan is about 40 mm. Adults are brown with an indistinct complex wingpattern.

Larvae feed on various Asteraceae species, including Ageratum houstonianum, Bidens pilosa and Calendula officinalis. The young larvae are smooth and green with a brown head. Later instars develop a purple herring-bone pattern with a black head. Finally they turn brown with a thin wavy white line along each side, and white spots. Pupation takes place in the soil.

References

External links

Australian Insects
The Moths of Borneo

Condicinae
Moths of Asia
Moths of Japan
Invertebrates of the Arabian Peninsula
Moths of New Zealand
Moths described in 1865